Speed Haste is a 3D racing video game for DOS. It includes both Formula One and stock cars. The player can compete in championship mode, covering all circuits with an increasing difficulty. The multiplayer mode offers split-screen racing or IPX-based sessions with up to 4 players.

In 2012, the game's developer, Javier Arevalo Baeza, released the C source code (minus some commercial libraries) as public-domain software on GitHub.

References

External links

1995 video games
DOS games
DOS-only games
Racing video games
Commercial video games with freely available source code
Public-domain software with source code
Video games developed in Spain